Oscar Micheaux's The Forged Note: A Romance Of The Darker Races is a 528-page novel published in 1915. It was republished in 2008 by Kessinger Publishing, LLC. The story pertains to a racially motivated lynching in Atlanta.

References

African-American novels
Novels set in Atlanta
Novels about racism
1915 American novels